The King's Commissioner of Limburg (Dutch: Commissaris van de Koning in Limburg) is the chairman of both the States of Limburg as well as the provincial executive.

In the Dutch province of Limburg, the King's Commissioner is usually called Gouverneur (governor), as in Belgium. Similarly, the Provinciehuis (Province Hall) in Maastricht is called Gouvernement (Governor's Residence). This local custom arose from the particular status of the current province in the nineteenth century.

In 1830, the whole of the province of Limburg, which at the time consisted of both the present Dutch and Belgian parts, joined in the Belgian Revolution, with the notable exception of the city of Maastricht. From then until 1839 Limburg was governed as part of Belgium. As per the 1839 Treaty of London, The Netherlands recognised Belgium's independence, but special provisions were made for Limburg (and Luxembourg). The province was divided into two, roughly taking river Meuse as the border, with most of the eastern half, although now an integral part of the Dutch territory, becoming a member of the German Confederacy as the "Duchy of Limburg" to appease Prussia, which had lost access to the Meuse after the Congress of Vienna. This peculiar arrangement, which excluded Maastricht and Venlo, lasted until the Confederation's dissolution in 1866.

The folklore custom to call the local King's Commissioner "Governor" dates from these times; nowadays it is used to underline the Limburgers' (self-)perceived otherness from "regular" Dutchmen.

List of King's and Queen's commissioners of Limburg

References

Limburg
 
Politics of Limburg (Netherlands)